The Hôpital Cochin is a hospital of public assistance in the rue du Faubourg-Saint-Jacques Paris 14e. It houses the central burn treatment centre of the city. The Hôpital Cochin is a section of the Faculté de Médecine Paris-Descartes. It commemorates Jean-Denis Cochin, curé of the parish of  Saint-Jacques-du-Haut-Pas and founder of a hospital for the workers and poor of that quarter of Paris.

Since 1990, a biomedical research centre, the Institut Cochin, has been associated with the hospital. It was reorganised in 2002 to embrace  genetic research, molecular biology and cellular biology, with a staff of about 600. It is part of both INSERM and CNRS, integrated with the Université Paris V.

In 2004 the Maison de Solenn, a shelter for adolescents, was opened within the hospital with the active support of Bernadette Chirac; its name commemorates Solenn Poivre d'Arvor.

History
Early in the morning of 30 May 1832, the mathematician Évariste Galois was shot in the abdomen during a duel at the age of 20 and died the following morning at ten o'clock in the Cochin hospital, probably of peritonitis, after refusing the offices of a priest. He was buried in a common grave in the Montparnasse Cemetery nearby.

George Orwell also had a stay at the hospital  for a bout of "La Grippe" in March 1929. He describes it in his story "How the Poor Die".

References

External links

Year of establishment missing
Cochin, Hopital
Buildings and structures in the 14th arrondissement of Paris